Posada Jaśliska  (Posada Yaslys’ka) is a village in the administrative district of Gmina Jaśliska, within Krosno County, Subcarpathian Voivodeship, in south-eastern Poland, close to the border with Slovakia.

The village has a population of 850.

References

Villages in Krosno County